The Gallantry Cross or Cross of Gallantry may refer to one of several military decorations:

 The Conspicuous Gallantry Cross, awarded by the United Kingdom for "an act or acts of conspicuous gallantry during active operations against the enemy".
 The Police Cross for Conspicuous Gallantry, awarded by the British South African Police in Rhodesia.
 The South African Police Silver Cross for Gallantry, awarded by the South African Police for "conspicuous and exceptional gallantry".
 The Gallantry Cross (Vietnam) or Vietnamese Cross of Gallantry, awarded by South Vietnam to soldiers and units "accomplishing deeds of valor or displayed heroic conduct while fighting an enemy force".
 The Air Gallantry Cross and Navy Gallantry Cross, awarded by South Vietnam for aerial and naval actions in which a Gallantry Cross may be awarded.